Dr. Dharmasiri Bandaranayake (born 06th of October 1949) is a Sri Lankan film director and playwright. Particularly work as a playwright, Bandaranayake is an artist who attempts to connect the sociopolitical environment with the civil society through art.

Career
Bandaranyake's debut Hansa Vilak in 1980 dealt with facets of a society at odds with itself. His other films like Thunveni Yamaya (1983), Suddilage Kathaawa (1984), Bawa Duka and Bawa Karma (1997) followed similar themes. Two films Bawa Duka and Bawa Karma challenged the repressive dogma of Buddhism in Sri Lanka. Common arcs in Bandaranayake's films follow the conflicted lives of men and women, transformation of private lives into public affairs, the unpleasant reality of marriage and society and the dark side of human desire.

He produced many stage plays such as Eka Adhipathi, Makarakshaya, Dhawala Bheeshana, Yakshagamanaya and Trojan Kanthavo have all dealt with current issues of national and political importance. In 1999, Bandaranyake first staged the play Trojan Kanthawo which adapted Euripides' Greek drama The Trojan Women for a Sinhala and Tamil audience. It is meant as an anti-war statement and proved to be controversial with the Sri Lankan government despite critical acclaim.

Bandaranayake received several death threats in 2001 after he made plans to stage the play in predominantly Tamil areas. In 2021, his film Hansa Vilak, a new copy has been reprinted with colored format and screened in cinemas from March 10.

Filmography

As actor

As director

References

External links
Dharmasiri Bandaranayake in Sinhala Cinema Database

Living people
Sri Lankan film directors
1949 births
Sri Lankan dramatists and playwrights
Sri Lankan theatre directors
Kala Suri
Kala Keerthi